WDOW (1440 AM) was a radio station licensed to Dowagiac, Michigan, broadcasting a sports radio format. According to Michguide.com, Kalamazoo Broadcasting (aka Kuiper Broadcasting), owner of WKPR AM 1420 Kalamazoo, is paying $80,000 to Langford Broadcasting as part of an agreement that would take WDOW off the air permanently and have WKPR move to AM 1440 and increase power in November 2010.

On March 24, 2011, the Federal Communications Commission cancelled WDOW's license and deleted the call sign from its database.

References
Michiguide.com - WDOW History

DOW
Sports radio stations in the United States
Defunct radio stations in the United States
Radio stations established in 1989
Radio stations disestablished in 2011
1989 establishments in Michigan
2011 disestablishments in Michigan
DOW